Pedro Ricardo Torres Ribeiro (born 26 November 1985) is a Portuguese football manager in charge of Académico de Viseu.

Career
Born in Guimarães, Braga District, Ribeiro had a modest career as a football player, and started his coaching career when he was 19 years old. Before starting his senior professional coaching career, he coached F.C. Tirsense and F.C. Vizela youth teams. He became assistant coach at C.D. Feirense in the second division under Quim Machado and helped the team gain promotion to the Primeira Liga. His next step was to work in FC Porto scouting department, where he worked directly with the first team as an opponent team analyst and scout. He was at Porto under André Villas-Boas, Jesualdo Ferreira and Vítor Pereira.

Pereira invited him to work on his technical staff, as assistant coach. He held this position for him until 2017, at Porto, Al-Ahli Saudi FC, Olympiacos FC, Fenerbahçe S.K. and TSV 1860 Munich.

On 23 February 2018, Ribeiro was appointed in his first position as head coach, at Gil Vicente F.C. who were 18th in the second division; he became the youngest coach in Portuguese professional football.

In July 2019, Ribeiro was appointed as manager of the under-23 team at Belenenses SAD. On 4 September, he took interim charge of the first team in the top flight following the dismissal of Silas, and nine days later was given the job on a permanent basis. He left the club from Belém by mutual accord the following 12 January, after three consecutive defeats left them a point above the relegation places.

Ribeiro returned to the second tier on 23 June 2020, succeeding Miguel Leal at F.C. Penafiel. At the end of the following year, he left the eighth-placed team by mutual consent, following three consecutive losses.

On the first day of 2022, Ribeiro filled the vacancy at Académico de Viseu F.C. caused by the exit of Zé Gomes. He left by mutual consent on 14 August, after starting the new season with an away draw and home defeat.

References

External links

1985 births
Living people
Sportspeople from Guimarães
Portuguese football managers
Primeira Liga managers
Liga Portugal 2 managers
Gil Vicente F.C. managers
Belenenses SAD managers
F.C. Penafiel managers
Portuguese expatriates in Greece
Portuguese expatriate sportspeople in Turkey
Portuguese expatriates in Saudi Arabia
Portuguese expatriates in Germany